Draževina is a small village in the municipality of Podgorica, Montenegro.

Demographics
According to the 2003 census, it had a population of 22.

According to the 2011 census, its population was 14, 10 of them Montenegrins.

References

Populated places in Podgorica Municipality